The San Francisco volcanic field is an area of volcanoes in northern Arizona, north of Flagstaff, US. The field covers 1,800 square miles (4,700 km²) of the southern boundary of the Colorado Plateau. The field contains 600 volcanoes ranging in age from nearly 6 million years old to less than 1,000 years (Miocene to Holocene), of which Sunset Crater is the youngest. The highest peak in the field is Humphreys Peak, at Flagstaff's northern perimeter: the peak is Arizona's highest at 12,633 feet (3,851 m) and is a part of the San Francisco Peaks, an active stratovolcano complex.

Description
This volcanic field seems to have formed from a geological hotspot. As the North American Plate moves over the spot, new volcanoes appear. Thus, the newest volcanoes are at the east side of the field. Most of the volcanoes are basalt cinder cones, but there are also large lava domes consisting of rhyolite and dacite.

Given that Sunset Crater is such a young volcanic feature of this area and that eruptions have occurred every several thousands of years in frequency, it is likely that there will be a future eruption in the San Francisco Volcanic field. However, it is impossible to predict when and exactly where a new eruption might occur. The United States Geological Survey (USGS) says that a future eruption would likely be in the eastern side of the volcanic field, where the most recent volcanic activity has occurred. Such an eruption is likely to be small and pose little hazard due to the remoteness of the area.

Visitation and usage

Popular tourist and hiking destinations in the volcanic field include the Kendrick Mountain Wilderness, 20 miles northwest of Flagstaff; and Sunset Crater. Sunset crater has a hiking trail along an ʻaʻā lava flow to its base.

Areas of the volcanic field have been used by NASA for testing techniques for exploration in a simulated extraterrestrial terrain environment. NASA has also conducted the Desert Research and Technology Studies (DRATS) tests here.

Notable vents

See also
 List of volcanoes in the United States

References

External links
 Satellite view of San Francisco Volcanic Field

Colorado Plateau
Landforms of Coconino County, Arizona
Polygenetic volcanic fields
Regions of Arizona
Volcanic fields of Arizona
Miocene volcanism
Pliocene volcanism
Pleistocene volcanism
Holocene volcanism

de:San Francisco Peaks